Hansa-Theater  is a theatre in the St. Georg quarter of Hamburg, Germany.

External links 

 www.hansa-theater.de

Theatres in Hamburg
Buildings and structures in Hamburg-Mitte
Theatres completed in 1878